Jean-Désiré Dimitri Sosso Dzabatou (born 26 May 1993 in Amiens), better known by his stage name Naza, is a French rapper and singer of Congolese descent. He is signed to Bomayé Musik and has released three albums, Incroyable (2017), C'est la loi (2018) and Bénef (2019).

Career
Born in Amiens, his family soon moved to Creil, where they operated a nganda, Congolese style bar-restaurant. He started music early, including cooperating with Cédric Matéta Nkomi, also of Congolese origin, a childhood friend later known as KeBlack and Isaac Ryler.

In 2014, with KeBlack seeing success online and through a collaboration with Youssoupha, he proposed his friend Naza to be featured in a number of releases and to be signed with the label Bomayé Musik, Youssoupha's label. "Gater le coin" became Naza's debut solo hit in 2016 followed by "La débauche" and "A gogo" in 2017. "MMM (Mouiller le maillot et mailler)", a soccer-themed song became a big hit for Naza with the inclusion of Brazilian Neymar and Ivory Coast player Serge Aurier. Naza also co-wrote "Bazardée", a hit for KeBlack in 2016 peaking at number seven on the French Singles Chart.

His debut album Incroyable in 2017 was certified gold. The follow up album was C'est la loi in 2018 both on Bomayé Musik.

Discography

Albums

Mixtapes

EPs

Singles

*Did not appear in the official Belgian Ultratop 50 charts, but rather in the bubbling under Ultratip charts.

Other charting songs

Featured in

*Did not appear in the official Belgian Ultratop 50 charts, but rather in the bubbling under Ultratip charts.

References

French rappers
French people of Democratic Republic of the Congo descent
1991 births
Living people
People from Amiens